The Huawei Mate series (previously the Huawei Ascend Mate series) is a line of high-end HarmonyOS-powered (formerly Android based) phablet smartphones produced by Huawei, and is one of the flagship smartphones along with the P series. Under the company's current hardware release cadence, P series phones are typically directed towards mainstream consumers as the company's flagship smartphones, refining and expanding upon technologies introduced in Mate series devices (which are typically positioned towards early adopters). Since 2016, Huawei has been in a co-engineering partnership with the German manufacturer Leica, whose lenses have subsequently been used on the Mate series.

Phones

Huawei Ascend Mate 

The Huawei Ascend Mate smartphone was announced in 2013 at CES. It was released in China in February 2013; its international release was in March 2013.

 Display: 6.1" IPS display with 720x1280 pixel resolution
 RAM: 1 or 2 GB
 Battery: 4050 mAh

Huawei Ascend Mate 2 4G 

Huawei announced the Huawei Ascend Mate 2 4G smartphone at CES in 2014.

 Display: 6.1" display with 720x1280 pixel resolution
 Processor: Qualcomm Snapdragon 400

Huawei Ascend Mate 7 
Released September 2014

 Display: 6.0 inches , 1080 x 1920 pixels
 Processor: HiSilicon Kirin 925

Huawei Mate S 

Huawei announced the Huawei Mate S smartphone on September 2, 2015 at IFA in Berlin.

 Display: 5.5-inch display with 1080x1920 pixel resolution
 Processor: HiSilicon Kirin 935
 RAM: 3 GB
 Battery: 2700 mAh

Huawei Mate 8 
Released on 26 November 2015 in China and globally Q1 2016.

 Display: 6.0-inch display with 1080x1920 pixel resolution
 Processor: HiSilicon Kirin 950
 Ram: 4 GB

Huawei Mate 9 
Released December 2016

 Display: 5.9-inch display IPS LCD capacitive touchscreen
 Processor: HiSilicon Kirin 960
 Ram: 4 GB

Huawei Mate 10 
Released November 2017

 Display: 5.9-inch display with 1440 x 2560 pixels
 Processor: HiSilicon Kirin 970
 Ram: 4 GB

Huawei Mate SE 
Huawei launched the Huawei Mate SE in the United States on March 6, 2018. It is an essentially a rebranded version of the international Honor 7X, as the Honor 7X smartphone that had previously been released in the United States was different from the international version.

 Display: 5.93-inch display with 1080x2160 pixel resolution
 Processor: HiSilicon Kirin 659
 Storage: 64 GB (expandable)
 RAM: 4 GB
 Battery: 3340 mAh
 Colors: Gray or Gold

Huawei Mate 20 

Huawei announced three phones in the Huawei Mate 20 series, the Huawei Mate 20, Huawei Mate 20 Pro, and Huawei Mate 20 X at an event in London, England on October 16, 2018, after announcing the cheaper Huawei Mate 20 lite in Berlin, Germany on August 31, 2018.

Huawei Mate X 

The Mate X is Huawei's first foldable device. The phone offers an 8-inch OLED display that folds outwards, with a wraparound design. While folded, there is a 6.6-inch screen on the front and a 6.38-inch screen on the back.

Huawei Mate X2 

The Huawei Mate X2 successor was unveiled on 22 February 2021, and do not feature Google services.

Huawei Mate Xs 2 
The Huawei Mate Xs 2 foldable smartphone was unveiled on 22 April 2022 which features the new HarmonyOS 2.0 operating system.

Huawei Mate 30 

The Huawei Mate 30 and Pro versions were unveiled on 19 September 2019 in Munich, Germany and released on 26 September 2019 in China. They are the first models that could be released without pre-installed Google apps because of US sanctions.

Huawei Mate 40 

The Huawei Mate 40 and Pro versions were unveiled on 22 October 2020, and do not feature Google services.

Huawei Mate 50  

The Huawei Mate 50, 50E and 50 Pro and 50 RS, the first phones in Mate Series with Huawei's in-house XMAGE imaging were unveiled on 6 September 2022 which features the new HarmonyOS 3.0 operating system.

Tablets

Huawei MatePad Pro 

The Huawei MatePad Pro was announced on 25 November 2019 and was officially released on 12 December 2019. It is one of Huawei's devices to feature no Google services just like many of the company's other recently released devices but still retains Android 10 as the source code for EMUI 10.1. The tablet received mainly positive reviews from critics but was criticised for its camera and lack of a wide variety of apps.

Huawei MatePad 
The Huawei MatePad was announced on 23 April 2020 and was officially released on 28 April 2020. It is one of Huawei's devices to feature no Google services just like many of the company's other recently released devices but still retains Android 10 as the source code for EMUI 10.1.

Huawei MatePad 11 
The Huawei MatePad 11 was announced June 2, 2021 during Huawei's HarmonyOS 2 launch and it was officially released on July 13, 2021. It is one of Huawei's first tablet devices to have HarmonyOS 2 pre-installed globally.

Huawei MatePad Pro 
The Huawei MatePad Pro 2021 line of 10.8 and 12.6 inch tablets was announced on June 2, 2021 during Huawei's HarmonyOS 2 launch and it was officially released on June 25, 2021 globally which marks the world's first tablets to have HarmonyOS pre-installed.

Huawei MatePad SE 
The Huawei MatePad SE was announced on April 28, 2022 and was officially released May 10, 2022 globally with HarmonyOS 2 pre-installed.

Huawei MatePad 
The Huawei MatePad 10.4 2022 model was announced on May 13, 2022 which was released on the same day globally with Android 10 as the source code for EMUI 10.1 pre-installed.

Huawei MatePad Pro 11 
The Huawei MatePad Pro 11 was announced on July 27, 2022 during Huawei's HarmonyOS 3 launch and was released August 10, 2022 globally with HarmonyOS 3 pre-installed.

Huawei MatePad C5e 
The Huawei MatePad C5e was announced on October 19, 2022 with Android 10 and was released November 2022 with Android 10 pre-installed.

See also 
Huawei MateBook
Huawei P series

References 

Android (operating system) devices